Edward Nelson Sprague Sr. (September 16, 1945 – January 10, 2020) was an American professional baseball pitcher who played eight seasons in Major League Baseball with four teams between 1968 and 1976.

Early life 
Sprague was born in Boston. He graduated from Sunset High School in Hayward, California, in 1963.

Career 
Sprague was scouted while pitching in the United States Army in Germany and was signed by the St. Louis Cardinals in 1966. A year later, he was traded to the Oakland Athletics. He entered the majors in 1968 with the Athletics, playing with them until 1969 before joining the Cincinnati Reds (1971–73), St. Louis Cardinals (1973) and Milwaukee Brewers (1973–76). With Milwaukee in 1974, when he set career-highs in wins (7), strikeouts (57) and earned run average (2.39) in 20 games, including 10 as a starter, before damaging knee ligaments which ended his season.

In an eight-season career, Sprague posted a 17–23 record with 188 strikeouts and a 3.84 ERA in 198 games, including 23 starts, three complete games, nine saves and 408 innings pitched.

Following his playing career, Sprague became the owner of the Stockton Ports and his wife the owner of a collegiate wood bat baseball team, the Lodi Crushers, in 2015 and 2016.

Personal life 
His son, Ed Jr., was the Toronto Blue Jays' first pick in the 1988 draft and played in the majors from 1991 to 2001. 

Sprague died on January 10, 2020, at the age of 74.

References

External links

Baseball Gauge
Baseball Library
Venezuelan Professional Baseball League

1945 births
2020 deaths
Baltimore Orioles scouts
Baseball players from California
Baseball players from Boston
Cincinnati Reds players
Eugene Emeralds players
Florida Instructional League Cardinals players
Indianapolis Indians players
Iowa Oaks players
Leones del Caracas players
American expatriate baseball players in Venezuela
Major League Baseball pitchers
Milwaukee Brewers players
Modesto Reds players
Oakland Athletics players
Rock Hill Cardinals players
St. Louis Cardinals players
Sportspeople from Hayward, California
Tulsa Oilers (baseball) players